is a Japanese actress. She won the award for best supporting actress at the 18th Yokohama Film Festival for Shall We Dance?

Filmography

Film
 Shall We Dance? (1996)
 The Twilight Samurai (2002)
 Kamen Rider × Kamen Rider × Kamen Rider The Movie: Cho-Den-O Trilogy (2010)
 Rent-a-Cat (2012)
 Orange (2015)
 A Day with No Name (2021)

Television
 Aoi (2000)
 Okaeri Mone (2021), Fumie

References

External links
 

1940 births
Living people
Actresses from Tokyo